Baron Inverforth, of Southgate in the County of Middlesex, is a title in the Peerage of the United Kingdom. It was created in 1919 for the Scottish shipping magnate Andrew Weir. He was head of the firm of Andrew Weir & Co, shipowners, and also served as Minister of Munitions from 1919 to 1921.  the title is held by his great-grandson, the fourth Baron, who succeeded his father in 1982.

Baron Inverforth (1919)
Andrew Weir, 1st Baron Inverforth (1865–1955)
Andrew Alexander Morton Weir, 2nd Baron Inverforth (1897–1975)
Andrew Charles Roy Weir, 3rd Baron Inverforth (1932–1982)
Andrew Peter Weir, 4th Baron Inverforth (b. 1966)

The heir apparent is the present holder's son, Hon. Benjamin Andrew Weir (b. 1997).

Arms

Notes

References

Kidd, Charles, Williamson, David (editors). Debrett's Peerage and Baronetage (1990 edition). New York: St Martin's Press, 1990, 

Baronies in the Peerage of the United Kingdom
Noble titles created in 1919